William Belser Spong Jr. (September 29, 1920October 8, 1997) was an American Democratic Party politician and a United States Senator who represented the state of Virginia from 1966 to 1973.

Biography

Early life and education
Spong was born in Portsmouth, Virginia, and attended public schools,  Hampden–Sydney College in Hampden Sydney, the University of Virginia in Charlottesville, and the University of Edinburgh in Scotland. He studied law, and was admitted to the bar in 1947, commencing practice in Portsmouth soon thereafter.  During World War II, Spong served in the Army Air Corps, Eighth Air Force from 1942 to 1945.  After the war, Spong was a lecturer in law and government at the College of William and Mary from 1948 to 1949.

State politics
Spong entered Virginia politics as a member of the Virginia House of Delegates from 1954 to 1955, and afterwards as a member of the Virginia State Senate from 1956 to 1966.  While in the Senate, Spong was chairman of the Virginia Commission on Public Education from 1958 to 1962.

National politics
In 1966, Spong was personally recruited by President Lyndon Johnson to mount a primary challenge against 20-year incumbent Senator A. Willis Robertson.  Johnson was angered at Robertson's opposition to the Civil Rights and Voting Rights Acts.  Spong defeated Robertson in one of the biggest upsets in Virginia political history and breezed to victory in November. Robertson resigned on December 31, 1966; Governor Mills Godwin appointed Spong to the seat, giving Spong higher seniority than other senators elected that November.  Spong's primary victory marked the beginning of the end of the Byrd Organization's long dominance of Virginia politics. Spong's Senate career was short-lived; in 1972, he was narrowly defeated  for reelection by 8th District Representative William L. Scott.

Spong would be the last Democrat elected to the Senate from Virginia until Chuck Robb's victory in 1988. Spong's Senate colleague, Harry F. Byrd Jr., became an independent in 1970.

Later life and death
After his Senate career, Spong returned to the practice of law, and also served as a law professor and the dean of the Marshall-Wythe School of Law at the College of William and Mary from 1976 to 1985. In 1976, Spong was president of the Virginia Bar Association. He was appointed interim president of Old Dominion University in 1988, and was a resident of Portsmouth until his death.  He is interred at the University of Virginia Cemetery in Charlottesville, Virginia.

Personal life

Humor
A popular Internet joke claims that William B. Spong of Virginia and Hiram Fong of Hawaii sponsored a bill recommending the mass ringing of church bells to welcome the arrival in Hong Kong of the U.S. Table Tennis Team after its tour of Communist China. The bill failed to pass, cheating the Senate out of passing the Spong-Fong Hong Kong Ping Pong Ding Dong Bell Bill.

In fact, Senator Spong never sponsored such a bill, but he did have some fun with the press soon after arriving in Washington, D.C. As described in an article by his cousin, the Rt. Rev. John Shelby Spong, Senator Spong:

was invited with the other freshman senators to address the National Press Club. Fearful that someone on radio or television would call him Senator Sponge, he used his brief five-minute introductory speech to that body to secure proper name identification. His first act as a senator, he announced in his southern drawl, would be to introduce a bill to protect the rights of songwriters in Hong Kong. He would be joined in this effort by the senior senator of Louisiana, Russell Long, and the senior senator from Hawaii, Hiram Fong, and together they would present the Long Fong Spong Hong Kong Song Bill. His name was never mispronounced by members of the media.

Other sources crediting Spong with the humorous bill name suggest different contexts.

Family
Spong married the former Virginia Wise Galliford. They had two children, Martha and Tom.

References

 Spong, John Shelby (May/June, 1998). "My Cousin Bill". Human Quest, p. 3. page

External links

1920 births
1997 deaths
United States Army Air Forces personnel of World War II
United States Army Air Forces soldiers
American legal scholars
Alumni of the University of Edinburgh
College of William & Mary faculty
Hampden–Sydney College alumni
Virginia lawyers
Democratic Party members of the Virginia House of Delegates
Democratic Party Virginia state senators
University of Virginia alumni
Politicians from Portsmouth, Virginia
Military personnel from Virginia
Democratic Party United States senators from Virginia
20th-century American politicians
Burials at the University of Virginia Cemetery